Weston Township is an inactive township in Platte County, in the U.S. state of Missouri.

Weston Township was erected in 1840, taking its name from the community of Weston, Missouri.

References

Townships in Missouri
Townships in Platte County, Missouri